The following is a list of indoor arenas in Italy with capacity for at least 4,000 spectators. Most of the arenas in this list are multi-purpose venues, used for individual sports, team sport as well as cultural and political events.

Currently in use

Proposed arenas

See also
List of football stadiums in Italy
List of indoor arenas in Europe
List of indoor arenas by capacity

References

 
Italy
Indoor arenas
Indoor arenas